Sigma Alpha Lambda National Leadership and Honors Organization is a National Leadership and Honors Organization with 70 chapters in the US. It was founded in 2001.

Membership
Membership in Sigma Alpha Lambda is open to all undergraduate students who meet the national requirements of sophomore classification or higher with a minimum cumulative GPA of 3.0 or higher on a 4.0 scale. Membership is also open to graduate students who meet the GPA requirement for undergraduates.  Members also have the opportunity to win various scholarships and awards through SAL ranging up to $5,000.

Scholarships and awards
Sigma Alpha Lambda offers its members annual scholarships and awards ranging up to $5,000.

National initiatives
Each year, Sigma Alpha Lambda undertakes two national initiatives which are coordinated by the National Office in conjunction with the local chapter. Each Fall, the students work together to fight hunger with SAL's Food Fight against Hunger.  In the Spring, the main focus is Relay for Life. Other recent national initiative include MLK Day of Service and 9/11 Memorial Flag Day.

Food Fight Against Hunger
SAL's Food Fight Against Hunger is a friendly competition that takes place every fall between SAL chapters all across the nation to raise the most non-perishable food items for local food banks. Since 2010, Sigma Alpha Lambda members have collected over 120,000 food items for their local food banks.

Relay for Life
Sigma Alpha Lambda is a National Youth Affiliate of the American Cancer Societies Relay for Life. Each spring, SAL chapters across the nation are encouraged to partake in their local Relay for Life and collect donations on behalf of their SAL team. In the 2018-2019 school year, Sigma Alpha Lambda members raised over $10,000 for Relay for Life, with the top three chapters each raising over $1,000.

Chapters
Sigma Alpha Lambda has 70 chapters at Universities around the United States. Below is the list of universities Sigma Alpha Lambda has chapters at currently or had in the past.
Appalachian State University
Arizona State University
Arkansas State University
Binghamton University
Boston University
California State University Fresno
California State University Fullerton
California State University Long Beach
Central Michigan University
Clemson University
Colorado State University
East Carolina University
East Tennessee State University
Eastern Michigan University
Eastern Washington University
Emporia State University
Florida International University
Florida State University
George Washington University
Georgia Southern University
Grambling State University
Grand Valley State University
Illinois State University
Indiana State University
Indiana University
Indiana University of Pennsylvania
Iowa State University
James Madison University
Kansas State University
Kent State University
Michigan State University
Middle Tennessee State University
Mississippi State University
Missouri State University
Montclair State University
Murray State University
New Mexico State University
Northeastern University
Northern Arizona University
Oakland University
Ohio State University
Ohio University
Oklahoma State University
Old Dominion University
Purdue University
Rowan University
San Diego State University
San Jose State University
Sonoma State University
Southeastern Louisiana University
Southern Illinois University Carbondale
Texas A&M University
Texas State University
Texas Tech University
University of Akron
University of Alabama
University of Alabama at Birmingham
University of Arizona
University of Arkansas at Little Rock
University of California, Berkeley
University of California, Davis
University of California, Los Angeles
University of California, Riverside
University of California, Santa Barbara
University of Central Arkansas
University of Central Oklahoma
University of Connecticut
University of Colorado Denver
University of Colorado Colorado Springs
University of Georgia
University of Illinois at Urbana Champaign
University of Iowa
University of Kansas
University of Kentucky
University of Louisiana at Lafayette
University of Louisville
University of Maryland Baltimore County
University of Maryland College Park
University of Memphis
University of Michigan
University of Minnesota
University of Mississippi
University of Montevallo
University of Nebraska at Lincoln
University of North Carolina at Chapel Hill
University of North Carolina at Charlotte
University of North Carolina at Greensboro
University of North Carolina at Wilmington
University of North Florida
University of North Texas
University of Northern Colorado
University of Oklahoma
University of Pittsburgh
University of South Carolina
University of South Florida
University of Southern California
University of Tennessee
University of Texas at Arlington
University of Texas at Austin
University of Texas at El Paso
University of Texas at San Antonio
University of Virginia
University of Washington
University of Wisconsin Madison
University of Wisconsin Whitewater
Valdosta State University
Virginia Commonwealth University
Virginia Polytechnic Institute
West Virginia University
Western Illinois University
Western Michigan University
Wichita State University
Youngstown State University

References

Honor societies
Student organizations established in 2001
2001 establishments in Arizona